Kim Jin-hee (born 26 March 1981) is a South Korean women's international footballer who plays as a midfielder. She was a member of the South Korea women's national football team, and was part of the team at the 2003 FIFA Women's World Cup.  At the club level, she plays for Ulsan College in South Korea.

International goals

References

External links

1981 births
Living people
South Korean women's footballers
South Korea women's international footballers
Place of birth missing (living people)
2003 FIFA Women's World Cup players
Women's association football midfielders
Footballers at the 2006 Asian Games
Incheon Hyundai Steel Red Angels WFC players
Asian Games competitors for South Korea